Myrmoecia is a genus of rove beetles in the family Staphylinidae. There are about nine described species in Myrmoecia.

Species
These nine species belong to the genus Myrmoecia:
 Myrmoecia canadensis Maruyama & Klimaszewski, 2006 g
 Myrmoecia confragosa (Hochhuth, 1849) g
 Myrmoecia lauta (Casey, 1893) i c g b
 Myrmoecia lugubris (Casey, 1893) i c g
 Myrmoecia physogaster (Fairmaire, 1860) g
 Myrmoecia plicata (Erichson, 1837) g
 Myrmoecia rigida (Erichson, 1839) g
 Myrmoecia triangulum (Pérez-Arcas, 1874) g
 Myrmoecia tuberiventris (Fairmaire, 1855) g
Data sources: i = ITIS, c = Catalogue of Life, g = GBIF, b = Bugguide.net

References

Further reading

 
 
 
 

Aleocharinae
Articles created by Qbugbot